Borkum Riff is a brand of pipe tobacco manufactured in Denmark for Scandinavian Tobacco Group.

History
'Borkum Riff' tobacco was launched in Sweden in the 1960s. It was a rough cut blend of Virginia and Burley tobaccos. The tobacco blend had been developed by Bertil Sandegård with an eye on the US pipe tobacco market. Initial sales were sluggish, but when Borkum Riff's Bourbon Whiskey blend was successfully introduced in the US in 1969, sales increased. Since then, new flavours and new packaging have been introduced. Today, Borkum Riff is also sold in India, Canada, Australia, Switzerland, Norway, Spain, New Zealand, Japan, France, Italy, Germany as well as in several other markets around the world. Borkum Riff's biggest market, however, is still the United States. Today, the Borkum Riff, which is manufactured in Denmark for Swedish Match, is the third largest tobacco producer on the Swedish market. In 2011 Borkum Riff ownership changed to Scandinavian Tobacco Group.

Borkum Riff was a lighthouse located at 53° 58' N, and 6° 22' E in Heligoland Bight off the Dutch coast in the North Sea. It was a landmark for seafarers and was well-known to Swedish radio listeners, as weather reports mentioned Borkum Riff several times a day. The former lightship called Borkum Riff was used from 1960 to 1964 as the first radio ship of Radio Veronica, which became the first off-shore radio station in the Netherlands. The ship in the Borkum Riff's company logo originates from a 17th-century engraving made by Johann Baptist Homann.

Manufacturing
The tobacco is manufactured on behalf of Swedish Match at the Scandinavian Tobacco Group's Orlik factory in Assens, Denmark. Formerly, it had been produced by Mac Baren on a dedicated production line.

References

External links
 Borkum Riff web site
 Swedish Match web site
 Offshore Radio 60's Eng 
  Offshore Radio Borkum Riff Ship Details Eng

Pipe tobacco brands
Products introduced in 1969